SANACC may refer to:

 SANACC, Scottish Anglers National Association Competition Clubs Ltd is the Association of Scottish Angling Clubs which organizes national fly fishing competitions. 
 SANACC, US State, Army, Navy, Air Force Coordinating Committee which approved Operation Bloodstone on June 10, 1948.